Midhun Murali (born 28 April 1996) is an Indian actor acted in Malayalam and Tamil films. He made his debut in 2003 Malayalam film Vajram with Mammootty in the lead role directed by Pramod Pappan. He also acted in the National award-winning Tamil movie Vazhakku Enn 18/9, directed by Balaji Sakthivel.He retired from films by 2016.

Personal life
Midhun was born to Muralidharan Nair and Latha Menon. He completed secondary education from Assisi Vidyaniketan Public School. He studied Mechanical Engineering from Adi Shankara Institute of Engineering & Technology, Ernakulam. Midhun is the younger brother of Malayalam actress Mrudula Murali. He completed MBA from Amity Global Business School, Kochi and is currently working in Muthoot.

Career
Midhun started as a child anchor in the program "Dial & See" telecasted in Jeevan TV along with his sister Mrudula Murali as co-anchor. He made his Tamil debut with Vazhakku Enn 18/9 (2012). In 2013 he acted in Malayalam films, Buddy and Black Butterfly, which was a remake of Vazhakku Enn 18/9. He  also appeared in Aana Mayil Ottakam, an anthology film, which was released on 20 November 2015 in theatres and online simultaneously.

Filmography

References

External links

Male actors from Kochi
1992 births
Living people
Male actors in Malayalam cinema
Male actors in Tamil cinema
Indian male film actors
21st-century Indian male actors